Bridget Becker (born January 1, 1981 in Ranfurly, Otago, New Zealand) is a New Zealand female curler.

On international level she is runner-up of 2010 World Mixed Doubles Curling Championship, runner-up and four-time bronze medallist of Pacific Curling Championships.

On national level she is nine-time New Zealand women's curling champion (2005, 2006, 2007, 2008, 2009, 2010, 2012, 2017, 2018), seven-time New Zealand mixed doubles curling champion (2007, 2009, 2010, 2011, 2015, 2016, 2017).

Teams and events

Women's

Mixed doubles

Personal life
Becker's family is well known in New Zealand as a curling family. Becker's mother, father, two brothers and grandfather have all represented New Zealand on an international scale. Becker's father, Peter Becker, is known as one of the first curlers to represent New Zealand internationally. He was also the coach of the women's team as well as the Secretary of the New Zealand Curling Association. Bridget's older brother, Sean has been the skip of the New Zealand men's national curling team. His wife, Cassie, made her international debut with the New Zealand women's team in 2008. Bridget's younger brother, Scott, is competitive curler too, he was skip of New Zealand men's team on 2018 Pacific-Asia Curling Championships.

References

External links
 
 

 Video: 

1981 births
Living people
New Zealand female curlers
New Zealand curling champions
People from Ranfurly, New Zealand